Evart may refer to:

 Evart, Michigan, a city
 Evart High School
 Evart Municipal Airport, a public airport near the city
 Evart Township, Michigan

See also
 Evarts (disambiguation)